Mikhail Tyulyapkin (born May 4, 1984) is a Russian former professional ice hockey defenceman. He most recently played with Amur Khabarovsk of the Kontinental Hockey League (KHL) before he was released from his contract after two games due to injury. He previously played for Atlant Moscow Oblast of the KHL. He was selected by the Minnesota Wild in the 9th round (268th overall) of the 2002 NHL Entry Draft.

References

External links

1984 births
Living people
Ak Bars Kazan players
Amur Khabarovsk players
Atlant Moscow Oblast players
Russian ice hockey defencemen
Minnesota Wild draft picks
HC Yugra players
Metallurg Novokuznetsk players
Torpedo Nizhny Novgorod players
Sportspeople from Nizhny Novgorod